Mingus Dynasty is a jazz album by Charles Mingus, recorded in 1959 and released on Columbia Records in May 1960. It is a companion album to his 1959 record, Mingus Ah Um, and was inducted in the Grammy Hall of Fame in 1999. The title alludes to Mingus's ancestry which was partially Chinese.

Tracks 1, 3, 4 and 5 were released in their unedited form in 1979 on vinyl and in 1999 on CD. The cuts amount to about 8 minutes.

Track listing 
All compositions by Charles Mingus except where noted.

 "Slop" – 6:16
 "Diane" – 7:32
 "Song With Orange" – 6:50
 "Gunslinging Bird" (Originally titled "If Charlie Parker Were a Gunslinger, There'd Be a Whole Lot of Dead Copycats") – 5:14
 "Things Ain't What They Used to Be" (Mercer Ellington) – 7:36
 "Far Wells, Mill Valley" – 6:14
 "New Now Know How" – 4:13
 "Mood Indigo" (Barney Bigard, Duke Ellington) – 8:13
 "Put Me in That Dungeon" – 2:53
 "Strollin'" (Originally titled "Nostalgia in Times Square") (Mingus, George Gordon) – 4:33 [Bonus track on CD]

Personnel
 Charles Mingus – bass
 John Handy – alto sax
 Booker Ervin – tenor sax
 Benny Golson – tenor sax (2, 3, 4, 6, 10)
 Jerome Richardson – baritone sax (2, 3, 4, 6, 10), flute (2)
 Richard Williams – trumpet (2, 3, 4, 6, 10)
 Don Ellis – trumpet (1, 5, 8, 9)
 Jimmy Knepper – trombone
 Roland Hanna – piano (1, 2, 3, 4, 5, 6, 8, 9)
 Nico Bunink – piano (7, 10)
 Dannie Richmond – drums
 Teddy Charles – vibes (2, 3, 4, 6)
 Maurice Brown – cello (2, 9)
 Seymour Barab – cello (2, 9)
 Honi Gordon – vocals (10)

50th Anniversary Legacy Edition 
In 2009 Sony's Legacy Recordings released a special 2-disc 50th Anniversary Edition of Mingus's seminal 1959 album Mingus Ah Um that also includes Mingus Dynasty in its entirety on the second disc.

References 

Charles Mingus albums
1960 albums
Columbia Records albums
Albums produced by Teo Macero
Grammy Hall of Fame Award recipients